Carroll Gartin (September 14, 1913 – December 19, 1966) was an American Democratic politician from Laurel in Jones County in southeastern Mississippi, who served three terms as the 22nd lieutenant governor of his state. He was born in Meridian, in eastern Mississippi.

He served his first two terms from 1952 to 1960 under fellow Democrats, Governors Hugh L. White and James P. Coleman. He returned to the office for two years under Paul B. Johnson Jr. but died midway in his term. In the 1963 campaign, Gartin accused Johnson's opponent, the Republican nominee Rubel Phillips of Corinth and Jackson, of having created an unnecessary general election, a scenario that was new to Mississippi. As a former Democrat, Gartin said that Phillips could have simply remained in the Democratic primary and thus voided the need for a third election.

Johnson's campaign was buoyed by outgoing Governor Ross Barnett and Democratic State Chairman Bidwell Adam. Johnson topped Phillips, 62%-38%, and Gartin defeated the Republican candidate for lieutenant governor, Stanford Morse, a state senator from Gulfport by an even larger 74%-26%.

Gartin was a staunch white supremacist and a former supporter of Governor and US Senator Theodore G. Bilbo. He was a member of the Mississippi State Sovereignty Commission, which was devoted to preserving racial segregation in the state.

Gartin was a delegate to the 1956 Democratic National Convention, which nominated the Stevenson-Kefauver ticket.

Gartin died of a heart attack in 1966 at Jones County Community Hospital, hours after he had checked in for chest pains.

The Carroll Gartin Justice Building, in the state capital, Jackson, is named after him and houses the Mississippi Supreme Court, the Mississippi Court of Appeals, and the state law library.

Gartin, an attorney, practiced law with Republican Charles W. Pickering.

References

 Political Graveyard
 Carroll Gartin's obituary

1913 births
1966 deaths
Lieutenant Governors of Mississippi
Mississippi lawyers
American white supremacists
Mississippi Dixiecrats
Mississippi Democrats
People from Laurel, Mississippi
Politicians from Meridian, Mississippi
20th-century American lawyers
20th-century American politicians